Desperadoes of Dodge City is a 1948 American Western film directed by Philip Ford and written by Robert Creighton Williams. The film stars Allan Lane, Eddy Waller, Mildred Coles, Roy Barcroft, Tristram Coffin and William Phipps. The film was released on September 15, 1948, by Republic Pictures.

Plot

Cast   
Allan Lane as Rocky Lane 
Black Jack as Black Jack
Eddy Waller as Nugget
Mildred Coles as Gloria Lamoreaux
Roy Barcroft as Homesteader
Tristram Coffin as Ace Durant
William Phipps as Ted Loring
James Craven as Cal Sutton
John Hamilton as Land Agent
Ed Cassidy as Gideon 
House Peters, Jr. as Henry
Dale Van Sickel as Henchman Pete
Peggy Wynne as Henry's Wife
Ted Mapes as Henchman Jake

References

External links 
 

1948 films
American Western (genre) films
1948 Western (genre) films
Republic Pictures films
Films directed by Philip Ford
American black-and-white films
1940s English-language films
1940s American films